Ceefax is the debut full-length album by the English post-rock band Fridge, released 10 March 1997. The album is notable for the fact that it contains three short tracks, "EDM", "EDM 2", and "EDM3", that are influenced by drum and bass.

The CD digipack case is natural-tone paper colour, with clear ink on the front, which is only visible when viewed at certain angles; track listings and other liner notes are on the album spine.

Track listing 
 "EDM" (1:09)
 "Helicopter" (2:08)
 "Tricity" (6:01)
 "More EH4-800" (11:00)
 "FDM" (0:27)
 "Robots In Disguise" (4:29)
 "EDM 2" (1:09)
 "Oracle" (6:11)
 "EDM3" (4:40)
 "Zed Ex Ay-Ti-Wan" (5:24)

References

1997 debut albums
Fridge (band) albums